Gheorghe Ovseannicov (born 12 October 1985) is a Moldovan professional football player who plays for FC Zaria Bălți.

Career
In addition to clubs from his native country, Ovseannicov also plied his trade for teams in Poland, Israel, and Kazakhstan.

International goal
Scores and results list Moldova's goal tally first.

References

External links
 
 

1985 births
Living people
Moldovan footballers
Moldova international footballers
Association football central defenders
CSF Bălți players
MKS Cracovia (football) players
Hapoel Rishon LeZion F.C. players
Moldovan expatriate sportspeople in Poland
Moldovan expatriate footballers
Expatriate footballers in Poland
Expatriate footballers in Israel
Israeli Premier League players